Elizabeth Anne (Berndt) George (1935–2012) was a botanical collector and writer active in Western Australia, specialising in the featherflowers Verticordia. Works include the coordination of the Verticordia Reference Collection, specimens that allowed an extensive revision of the genus by the botanist Alex George, and the standard reference Verticordia; the turner of hearts (2002).

Elizabeth George was commemorated in the naming of Verticordia elizabethiae, a species described in 2020.

References

1935 births
2012 deaths
Natural history collectors
People from Perth, Western Australia